Mee Siput Muar or simply Mee Siput is a cracker which originated from and is commonly available in Muar, Johor, Malaysia. 

They are dried in the sun before being deep-fried in cooking oil until crispy and crunchy. The ready-to-eat snack is best served with condiments like sambal, chili paste or chili soya sauce. Beside its spiral snail-look-aliked shape which has contributed to the name of Mee Siput, the so-called snail noodle cracker also has a crispy texture similar to the light, brittle feeling of a snail shell once it breaks in the mouth. 

In present times, the factory and machinery produced  mostly were not made in the traditional "snail shell" form, but rather in a randomly swirled pattern due to mass production for durability, efficiency and commercial reasons.

See also 
 List of Malaysian dishes
 Malaysian cuisine

References

Malaysian snack foods
Malaysian noodle dishes
Malay cuisine
Muar District